Cadurcia is a genus of flies in the family Tachinidae.

Species
C. auratocauda Curran, 1934
C. borbonensis Villeneuve, 1926
C. depressa Villeneuve, 1926
C. fascicauda Curran, 1934
C. lucens Villeneuve, 1926
C. mesnili Verbeke, 1962
C. plutellae Emden, 1942
C. semiviolacea Villeneuve, 1926
C. versicauda Curran, 1934
C. vinsoni Mesnil, 1952
C. zetterstedti Karsch, 1886

References

Diptera of Asia
Exoristinae
Tachinidae genera
Taxa named by Joseph Villeneuve de Janti